Dawn Records was an American record label. It was founded as a subsidiary of Seeco Records in 1954 and was run by Sidney Siegel.

Dawn began to release albums in the mid-1950s, issuing primarily jaz recordings, but also pop, R&B, and folk revival material. While it was active only for a few years, it released some significant jazz releases. Its holdings were bought later by Biograph Records and then by Fresh Sound Records, both of which reissued much of its catalog on CD.

Artists
Al Cohn
Paul Quinichette
Mat Mathews
Dick Garcia
Frank Rehak
Joe Puma
Zoot Sims
Randy Weston
Charlie Rouse
Julius Watkins
Lucky Thompson
Jimmy Raney
Gene Quill
Bob Brookmeyer
Gérard Pochonet
Rita Reys
The Treniers
Aaron Sachs

References

American record labels
Record labels established in 1954